Lasionycta secedens is a moth of the family Noctuidae. It has a Holarctic distribution. North American populations are distributed from Labrador, northern Manitoba, and Alaska, southward to northern Maine, northern Minnesota, and south-central British Columbia. Subspecies bohemani occurs in northern Eurasia, Alaska and Yukon.

It is found in boreal forest, especially bogs, and is both diurnal and nocturnal.

Early instar larvae prefer to feed on the epidermis of leaves of Vaccinium vitis-idaea, but is polyphagous when reared. In Scandinavia the larva overwinters twice. In Minnesota this species occurs in raised bogs with Vaccinium vitis-idaea suggesting that this is the foodplant in North America.

Subspecies
Lasionycta secedens secedens (from eastern Canada to northern British Columbia)
Lasionycta secedens bohemani (northern Eurasia, Alaska and Yukon)

External links
A Revision of Lasionycta Aurivillius (Lepidoptera, Noctuidae) for North America and notes on Eurasian species, with descriptions of 17 new species, 6 new subspecies, a new genus, and two new species of Tricholita Grote
Images

Lasionycta
Moths of North America
Moths of Europe
Moths described in 1858